Geomitra moniziana is a species of air-breathing land snail, terrestrial pulmonate gastropod mollusks in the family Geomitridae.

This species is endemic to Madeira, Portugal. It is mentioned in annexes II and IV of the Habitats Directive.

It is often called the Madeiran land snail, but this is also used as a name for several other species in various genera.

References

Geomitra
Endemic fauna of Madeira
Molluscs of Madeira
Gastropods described in 1867
Taxonomy articles created by Polbot